Panai may refer to:
Panai Kongpraphan (b. 1983), Thai footballer
Panai (Taiwanese singer)
Panai, Iran
Panai Kingdom on the northern coast of Sumatra in the Srivijaya period. Nearby sites were Barus and Lamuri. (See also: historic map detailing location)